John Saunderson (born 31 May 1948) is a former Australian politician and trade unionist. He was an Australian Labor Party member of the Australian House of Representatives from 1983 to 1990, representing the electorates of Deakin (1983–84) and Aston (1984-90).

Early life
Saunderson was born on 31 May 1948 in Slough, England. He was a senior technical officer for Telecom from 1964 to 1980, state president of the Australian Telecommunications Employees Association from 1976 to 1980, and an industrial officer for the union from 1980 until 1983.

Political career
In 1983, Saunderson was elected to the Australian House of Representatives as the Labor member for Deakin, and in 1984 successfully contested the new seat of Aston. A convenor of the Labor Left faction in the later years of the Hawke government, Saunderson was a consistent opponent of attempts to privatise government assets, opposed uranium sales to France, played a significant role in the defeat of the Australia Card by opposing his own government's bill as a member of the select committee into it, supported restricting negative gearing to assist first-home buyers, heavily criticised the Cain state government over its handling of tramway disputes, supported broadcasting legislation reform in response to the Alan Bond scandal, opposed liberalising foreign ownership of television stations, and supported the introduction of pay television.

He was defeated by Liberal candidate Peter Nugent at the 1990 election amidst a large anti-Labor swing related to the collapse of the State Bank of Victoria.

Later activities
After his defeat, Saunderson returned to his old union, which became the Communications, Electrical and Plumbing Union, as a policy and research officer and then industrial officer.

References

Australian Labor Party members of the Parliament of Australia
Members of the Australian House of Representatives for Deakin
Members of the Australian House of Representatives for Aston
Members of the Australian House of Representatives
1948 births
Living people
20th-century Australian politicians